Kazys Boruta (6 January 1905, in Kūlokai, near Marijampolė – 9 March 1965, in Vilnius) was a Lithuanian writer, poet and political activist. 

His most notable work, Baltaragio malūnas (Whitehorn's Windmill), was adapted as a play, a movie Velnio nuotaka (Devil's Bride), and a ballet.

References

1905 births
1965 deaths
People from Marijampolė Municipality
Lithuanian socialists
Lithuanian politicians
Lithuanian male poets
Lithuanian novelists
20th-century poets
20th-century novelists
20th-century male writers
Burials at Rasos Cemetery